The 2020–21 Arizona State women's basketball team represented Arizona State University during the 2020–21 NCAA Division I women's basketball season. The Sun Devils, were led by twenty fourth-year head coach Charli Turner Thorne, playing their home games at the Desert Financial Arena and are members of the Pac-12 Conference.

Previous season
The Sun Devils finished the season 20–11, 10–8 in Pac-12 play to finish in sixth place. They advanced to the first round of the Pac-12 women's tournament where they lost to California.  The NCAA tournament and WNIT were cancelled due to the COVID-19 pandemic.

Roster

Source:

Schedule

|-
!colspan=12 style=| Regular season

|-
!colspan=12 style=| Pac-12 Tournament

|-
!colspan=12 style=| WNIT

|-

Source:

Rankings

*AP does not release post-NCAA Tournament rankings.^Coaches did not release a Week 1 poll.

See also
2020–21 Arizona State Sun Devils men's basketball team

References

Arizona State Sun Devils women's basketball seasons
Arizona State
Arizona State Sun Devils women's basketball
Arizona State Sun Devils women's basketball